The Limpedea is a left tributary of the river Trebeș in Romania. It flows into the Trebeș near the city Bacău.

References

Rivers of Romania
Rivers of Bacău County